James Berry, OBE, Hon FRSL (28 September 1924 – 20 June 2017), was a Jamaican poet who settled in England in the 1940s. His poetry is notable for using a mixture of standard English and Jamaican Patois. Berry's writing often "explores the relationship between black and white communities and in particular, the excitement and tensions in the evolving relationship of the Caribbean immigrants with Britain and British society from the 1940s onwards". As the editor of two seminal anthologies, Bluefoot Traveller (1976) and News for Babylon (1984), he was in the forefront of championing West Indian/British writing.

Biography
The son of Robert Berry, a smallholder, and his wife Maud, a seamstress, James Berry was born and grew up in rural Portland, Jamaica. He began writing stories and poems while still at school. During the Second World War, as a teenager, he went to work for six years (1942–48) in the United States, before returning to Jamaica. 
In his own words:
"America had run into a shortage of farm labourers and was recruiting workers from Jamaica. I was 18 at the time. My friends and I, all anxious for improvement and change, were snapped up for this war work and we felt this to be a tremendous prospect for us. But we soon realised, as we had been warned, that there was a colour problem in the United States that we were not familiar with in the Caribbean. America was not a free place for black people. When I came back from America, pretty soon the same old desperation of being stuck began to affect me. When the Windrush came along, it was godsend, but I wasn't able to get on the boat.... I had to wait for the second ship to make the journey that year, the SS Orbita."

Settling in 1948 in Great Britain, he attended night school, trained and worked as a telegrapher in London, while also writing. He has been reported as saying: "I knew I was right for London and London was right for me. London had books and accessible libraries."

He became an early member of the Caribbean Artists Movement, founded in 1966 by Edward Kamau Brathwaite, Andrew Salkey and John La Rose, and in 1971 was its acting chair. In 1976 Berry compiled the anthology Bluefoot Traveller and in 1979 his first poetry collection, Fractured Circles, was published by New Beacon Books. In 1981 he won the Poetry Society's National Poetry Competition, the first poet of West Indian origin to do so. He edited the landmark anthology News for Babylon (1984), considered "a ground-breaking publication because its publishing house Chatto & Windus was 'mainstream' and distinguished for its international poetry list".

Berry wrote  many books for young readers, including A Thief in the Village and Other Stories (1987), The Girls and Yanga Marshall (1987), The Future-Telling Lady and Other Stories (1991), Anancy-Spiderman (1988), Don't Leave an Elephant to Go and Chase a Bird (1996) and First Palm Trees (1997). His A Story About Afiya was published by Lantana in 2020 and named one of the New York Times Best Children's Books of the year. It was also listed in the New York Times list of children's books that "let young minds wonder and wander on their own."

His last book of poetry, A Story I Am In: Selected Poems (2011), draws on five earlier collections: Fractured Circles (1979), Lucy’s Letters and Loving (1982, Chain of Days (1985), Hot Earth Cold Earth (1995) and Windrush Songs (2007).
In 1995, his "Song of a Blue Foot Man" was adapted and staged at the Watford Palace Theatre.

In 1990, Berry was made an Officer of the Order of the British Empire (OBE) for services to poetry. In September 2004 he was one of fifty Black and Asian writers who have made major contributions to contemporary British literature who featured in the historic "A Great Day in London" photograph at the British Library. His archives were acquired by the British Library in October 2012. Among other items, the archive contains drafts of an unpublished novel, The Domain of Sollo and Sport.

He died in London on 20 June 2017 after suffering from Alzheimer's disease.

Selected publications
 Bluefoot Traveller: An Anthology of Westindian Poets in Britain (editor), London: Limestone Publications, 1976; revised edition Bluefoot Traveller: Poetry by West Indians in Britain, London: Harrap, 1981
 Fractured Circles (poetry), London: New Beacon Books, 1979
 Lucy's Letters and Loving, London: New Beacon Books, (1982)
 News for Babylon: The Chatto Book of Westindian-British Poetry (editor), London: Chatto & Windus, 1984
 Chain of Days, Oxford University Press, 1985
 A Thief in the Village and other stories (for children), London: Hamish Hamilton, 1987
 The Girls and Yanga Marshall: four stories (for children), London: Longman, 1987
 Anancy-Spiderman: 20 Caribbean Folk Tales (for children), illustrated by Joseph Olubo, London: Walker, 1988
 When I Dance (for children), Hamish Hamilton, 1988
 Isn't My Name Magical? (for children), Longman/BBC, 1990
 The Future-Telling Lady and other stories (for children), London: Hamish Hamilton, 1991
 Ajeemah and his Son (for children), USA: HarperCollins, 1992
 Celebration Song (for children), London: Hamish Hamilton, 1994
 Classic Poems to Read Aloud (editor), London: Kingfisher, 1995
 Hot Earth Cold Earth, Bloodaxe Books, 1995
 Playing a Dazzler (for children), London: Hamish Hamilton, 1996
 Don't Leave an Elephant to Go and Chase a Bird (for children), USA: Simon & Schuster, 1996
 Everywhere Faces Everywhere (for children), Simon and Schuster, 1997
 First Palm Trees (for children), illustrated by Greg Couch, Simon & Schuster, 1997
 Around the World in 80 Poems (editor – for children), London: Macmillan, 2001
 A Nest Full of Stars (for children), London: Macmillan, 2002
 Only One of Me (selected poems – for children), London: Macmillan, 2004
 James Berry Reading from his poems for children, CD, The Poetry Archive, 2005
 Windrush Songs, Bloodaxe Books, 2007
 A Story I Am In: Selected Poems, Bloodaxe Books, 2011

Awards
 1977–78, C. Day-Lewis Fellowship
 1981, National Poetry Competition (for "Fantasy of an African Boy")
 1987, Smarties Prize (for A Thief in the Village)
 1989, Signal Poetry Award (for When I Dance)
 1989, Coretta Scott King Book Award
 1991, Cholmondeley Award
 1993, Boston Globe-Horn Book Award (for Ajeemah and His Son)
 2007, Honorary Fellow of the Royal Society of Literature

References

External links

 British Library announcement of Berry archive acquisition, 16 October 2012
 

1924 births
2017 deaths
20th-century Jamaican poets
Jamaican male poets
Migrants from British Jamaica to the United Kingdom
British children's writers
Black British writers
Anthologists
21st-century Jamaican poets
Officers of the Order of the British Empire
20th-century male writers
21st-century male writers
Caribbean Artists Movement people
Deaths from dementia in England
Deaths from Alzheimer's disease